The National Professional Soccer League (NPSL) was a South African association football league that existed between 1971 and 1995. During those years, the league, however, had three completely different organisations.

History

1971–1977
In 1971–1977 it was only for Black South African teams. It was a racial league for Black people only.

1978–1984

Then it merged with National Football League (NFL), which previously had been organised only for White South African players in 1959–1977. The two leagues together formed a new topflight “non-racial” football league in 1978–1984 (also named NPSL), where the “white teams” were allowed to field a maximum of three black players. Some teams were for white people while other teams were of black people, and on the club's of whites only 3 blacks were allowed.

In January 1985, Kaizer Chiefs owner Kaizer Motaung lodged a complaint that it was unfair that 10% of revenue from a testimonial match for Ace Ntsoelengoe and Jomo Sono was expected to go to various administrative bodies including SANFA. Several clubs question the conflicts of interest for George Thabe to be the president of the NPLS and SANFA at the same time. Fifteen of the sixteen clubs petitioned for Thabe to resign as NPSL chairman and a proposal for constitution changes that remove SANFA’s veto rights over NPSL. On 29 January, Thabe told those clubs who wanted to him resign should leave the NPSL.

In February 1985, it was announced that the clubs wanting to break away had arranged sponsorship with South African Breweries, the existing sponsor of NPSL, and a newly created National Soccer League (NSL) would begin on 23 February in accordance with anti-apartheid principles.

1985–1995

The remaining part of NPSL continued to co-exist as an independent league (South Africa had two top division Leagues which were NPSL and NSL), until it folded in December 1995. When NPSL folded, the few remaining teams continued to play the next 1996–97 season in the “2nd Division of NSL”, which at that point of time became renamed to the National First Division.

Most titles

References

 
Defunct soccer leagues in South Africa
Soccer and apartheid
South